{{DISPLAYTITLE:C9H14N4O3}}
The molecular formula C9H14N4O3 (molar mass: 226.24 g/mol, exact mass: 226.1066 u) may refer to:

 Carnosine
 Nimorazole